Events from the year 1991 in Jordan.

Incumbents
Monarch: Hussein 
Prime Minister: 
 until 19 June: Mudar Badran 
 19 June-21 November: Taher al-Masri
 starting 21 November: Zaid ibn Shaker

Sports

 1991–92 Jordan League.

Births

 6 January - Zaid Jaber.
 10 January - Saddam Abdel-Muhsan.
 21 December - Baraah Awadallah.

See also

 Years in Iraq
 Years in Syria
 Years in Saudi Arabia

References

 
1990s in Jordan
Jordan
Jordan
Years of the 20th century in Jordan